Ivan Busse (18 July 1914 – 16 January 2011) was a South African cricketer. He played in three first-class matches for Border from 1931/32 to 1946/47.

See also
 List of Border representative cricketers

References

External links
 

1914 births
2011 deaths
South African cricketers
Border cricketers
Sportspeople from Qonce